At  the Vordere Kesselschneid is the highest summit in the Zahmer Kaiser, the northern chain of the Kaiser Mountains in the Austrian state of Tyrol.

Its summit is located southeast of the oft-visited Pyramidenspitze and is separated from it by a ca. 50 m deep saddle. To the east of the mountain is a long, rocky arête, partly covered with mountain pines which runs over the  Hintere Kesselschneid (1,995 m) to the Roßkaiser (1,970 m). To the north its steep rock faces drop into the Winkelkar cirque, to the west lies the long plateau of the Kaisergebirge and the Pyramidenspitze and to the south the mountain falls sharply into the Kaisertal.

Routes 
The easiest and most-frequented route to the Vordere Kesselschneid is from the Pyramidenspitze to the northeast. From there you have to descend about 50 metres to a saddle and then make your way without the help of a path, but without any difficulties, across a grassy slope to the cairn on the summit. The walk from the Pyramidenspitze takes 20 minutes.

References

Mountains of the Alps
Mountains of Tyrol (state)
Kaiser Mountains
Two-thousanders of Austria